Still on My Mind is the fifth studio album by English singer Dido, released on 8 March 2019 through BMG. It is her first studio album since 2013's Girl Who Got Away. The album was supported by singles "Give You Up", "Take You Home", "Friends" and  "Just Because".

Recording
Dido wrote and recorded the album in the UK with her brother Rollo. She said she "only wanted to make another album if it was with him", and called the recording process simple and an "absolutely magical experience", saying it was "made in such an easy way, all the vocals recorded on the sofa, a lot of it recorded at home".

Dido said she inadvertently made the album very similar to No Angel. Dido felt no one would ever hear No Angel at the time of its release and that the feeling that no one would hear her album crept into Still on My Mind because she had a good time recording it.

Dido learned a lot about production while making the album on songs like "Hell After This" and "Mad Love". She described her style of production as less professional, haphazard, and a mess compared to her brother, Rollo Armstrong, as she records everything in one take and is constantly deleting stuff. The final track on the album, "Have to Stay", was recorded in its first take as she was writing it. The person Dido was writing with, Ryan Laubscher, doesn't move chords for the first two verses of the song because he's getting to grips with what she's singing as she's singing it for the first time. Dido said she loved the feel of it so much that when she came in to record it properly, it never felt the same, so she kept the first recording.

Music
The album is said to display Dido's "love of hip hop and her folk roots", and feature "a dance and electronic music sensibility". According to Neil Z. Yeung of AllMusic, Still on My Mind is essentially an electro-folk album with a "hip hop heartbeat" and  elements of electro-pop, synth-pop, disco and new age.

Critical reception

Still on My Mind received generally positive reviews from music critics. At Metacritic, which assigns a normalized rating out of 100 to reviews from mainstream critics, the album has an average score of 70 based on 11 reviews, indicating "generally favourable reviews".

Promotion

Dido first announced the single "Give You Up" while answering fan questions on Twitter, and also revealed the title of "Chances". Dido later stated in an interview with the Evening Standard that the final track on the album would be a song about parenthood titled "Have to Stay".

Dido performed "Give You Up" live on The Jonathan Ross Show, which aired on 9 March 2019.

Despite releasing a total of four singles from the album, Dido failed to promote the last three at all, due to being on tour.

Track listing
Credits adapted from the album's liner notes

Notes
 Denny Thakrar is incorrectly credited as D. Thaker
 signifies an additional producer
 signifies a remixer

Charts

Weekly charts

Year-end charts

Certifications

Release history

References

2019 albums
Dido (singer) albums
BMG Rights Management albums
Albums produced by Rollo Armstrong
Albums recorded at RAK Studios